The D46 state road in the eastern part of Croatia connects the cities and towns of Đakovo and Vinkovci to the state road network of Croatia, and to the border with Serbia. The route comprises some urban intersections, mostly in the cities Đakovo and Vinkovci, though it bypasses most of the latter city and is planned to bypass it completely.

The D46 state road starts in the Osijek-Baranja County in the region of Slavonia, enters the Vukovar-Syrmia County and intersects it orthogonally to the D55 state road, ending in the region of Syrmia. Following the Tovarnik border crossing it continues in Serbia as the State Road 120.

The road, as well as all other state roads in Croatia, is managed and maintained by Hrvatske ceste, state-owned company.

Traffic volume 

Traffic is regularly counted and reported by Hrvatske ceste, operator of the road.

2019 truck traffic volume demonstrations 
In early 2019 villages of Tovarnik, Ilača and Banovci organized joint demonstrations against truck drivers from countries other than Croatia and Serbia which are causing heavy traffic congestion on the D46 road while waiting to cross the state border between Croatia and Serbia. Citizens requested redirection of all truck transportation, with the exception of Croatian and Serbian trucks traveling to one or the other state, to be removed from the D46 road and redirected to A3 motorway.

Road junctions and populated areas

Maps

Sources

D046
D046
D046